TSS Waterford was a passenger vessel built for the Great Western Railway in 1912. The ship was sold in 1924 and became the Philippine merchant ship Panay which was sunk by Japanese aircraft in 1942.

Design
The ship achieve a speed of 10 knots.

History

She was built by Swan, Hunter & Wigham Richardson Limited in Neptune Yard, Low Walker on the River Tyne for the Great Western Railway. She was launched on 20 February 1912, and later that year started work on the Fishguard to Waterford service.

In 1924 she was sold to Fernández Hermanos, Cia Maritime, Manila and renamed Panay.

Panay, being used after the Japanese landings in the Philippines to transport arms and ammunition from Luzon to the west coast of Negros, was sunk by Japanese aircraft at Campomanes Bay in March 1942. Arms and ammunition were salvaged by divers in order to arm the guerilla forces forming on the island. The wreck is now a dive site attraction near the city of Sipalay.

References

1912 ships
Passenger ships of the United Kingdom
Steamships of the United Kingdom
Ships built on the River Tyne
Ships of the Great Western Railway
Ships built by Swan Hunter
Merchant ships of the Philippines
Ships sunk by Japanese aircraft
Wreck diving sites
Maritime incidents in March 1942
World War II shipwrecks in the South China Sea
Underwater diving sites in the Philippines
Merchant ships sunk by aircraft